Martin Brerton (born 20 February 1961) is an Irish boxer. He competed in the men's light welterweight event at the 1980 Summer Olympics.

References

1961 births
Living people
Irish male boxers
Olympic boxers of Ireland
Boxers at the 1980 Summer Olympics
Place of birth missing (living people)
Light-welterweight boxers